D.T. Pollard is the pen name of Danny Pollard, the African-American author of Rooftop Diva: A Novel of Triumph After Katrina and The Trophy Wife Network.

Rooftop Diva was listed as the #1 fiction paperback in a list of local  bestsellers from Jokae's African-American Books published in the Dallas Morning News.

He grew up in Henderson, Texas, and now lives in Grand Prairie, Texas with his wife and son.

Bibliography
Rooftop Diva
The Trophy Wife Network
Tarp Town USA

External links
Official site

References

21st-century American novelists
African-American novelists
American male novelists
Florida A&M University alumni
Novelists from Texas
Living people
Year of birth missing (living people)
21st-century American male writers
21st-century African-American writers
African-American male writers